The Myanmar Motion Picture Academy Awards are presented annually to honour both artistic and technical excellence of professionals in the Burmese Film Industry of Myanmar. The awards ceremony has been held annually since 1952. Each winner is presented with a golden statue and in recent years also a cash prize.

History

The awards were first introduced in 1952, and the ceremony has been held annually since 1952 (apart from 1963, 1986, 1987, and 1988). In the first awards ceremony, only three kinds of awards (Best Film, Best Actor and Best Actress) were presented. In the beginning, second and third place prizes for Best Film category were also given. Over time the awards ceremony has expanded significantly; in 1954, a Best Director award was introduced with the second and third place prizes for Best Film being removed in 1955. In 1955, first Special Award for Best Child Artist was awarded. In 1956 a Best Cinematography award was created, and in 1962, Best Supporting Actor and Actress awards were also introduced. In 1990, the number of awards reached 10 with the addition of Best Screenplay, Best Music and Best Sound awards. The awards have topped out at 11 with the addition of a Best Editing award. In 2017, Myanmar Academy Awards introduced the Lifetime Achievement Award category.

Adding to the unpredictability of the awards ceremony are prizes given to Special Awards some years and the duplication of awards when the judging panel cannot decide who should win. And of course, sometimes awards are simply not awarded if it is decided that no person is worthy.

The first film to win the best picture award was Chit Thet Wai (Dear Thet Wai) in 1952. The best director award was first given to U Thu Kha for his Aww Main Ma (Oh, women!), a comic drama. Actor Kyaw Win won the first best actor award in Marlaryi with Kyi Kyi Htay winning best actress for her performance in Chit Thet Wai (Dear Thet Wai).

As of 2017, there are total of 13 awards.

 Best Picture
 Best Director
 Best Screenplay
 Best Actor
 Best Actress
 Best Supporting Actor
 Best Supporting Actress
 Best Music
 Best Cinematography
 Best Film Editing
 Best Sound
 Special Award
 Lifetime Achievement Award

List of Myanmar Motion Picture Academy Awards

1999
Best Film - Father's Place (Thiha Zaw Film Production)
Best Director - Khin Maung Oo & Soe Thein Htut (Father's Place)
Best Actor - Lwin Moe (Winter in the heart)
Best Actress - Htun Eaindra Bo (Hnaung Ta Myae Myae)
Best Supporting Actor - Htun Htun Win (Hnaung Htone Phwae Metta)
Best Supporting Actress - Myat Kathy Aung (Winter in the Heart)
Special Award - Ei Phyu Soe (Winter in the Heart)

2000
Thiha Tin Soe (Hell man)
Myo Thandar Tun (Blade on the Lips)

2001
Lwin Moe (Born of a flower)
Min Maw Kun (Nha Lone Hla Lu Mike)
May Than Nu (Else other side of love)
Htet Htet Moe Oo (Tha Mee Mite)

2002
Lumin (Golden bling of sky)
Khin Zar Chi Kyaw (Ngar, Thu Ta Bar, Youk Kyar, Main Ma)

2003
Kyaw Hein (Sun borns Moon)
Htun Eaindra Bo (A Mae Noe Boe)

2004
Lwin Moe (Once Nights of Ayeyarwaddy)
Eaindra Kyaw Zin (Myet Nar Myer Dae Moe Kaung Kin)

2005
Lu Min (King Kyan Sitt)
Htun Eaindra Bo (Moe Kot Set Wine Ko Kyaw Lon Ywae)

2006
Yan Aung (Diginity of Extreme love)
Nandar Hlaing (Loyalty of Taungsaman)

2007
Kyaw Ye Aung (Ninety times of love)
Leading Actress (Not awarded)

2008
Khant Si Thu (A myar nae ma thet sai thaw thu)
Moh Moh Myint Aung (Myint Mo Htet Ka Tarafu) 

2009
Nay Toe (Moe Nya Eain Met Myu)
Leading Actress (not awarded)

2010

Pyay Ti Oo (Adam Eva Dassa)
Thet Mon Myint (Adam Eva Dassa)

2011
Naung Naung (Eternal rays of light)
Melody (Eternal rays of light)

2012
Pyay Ti Oo (Lat Pan)
Phway Phway (Lat Pan)

2013
Best actor-Pyay Ti Oo (As you like)
Best Actress-Wutt Hmone Shwe Yi (As you like)

2014
Best Film-Phyo Yadanar Thwal (Goodmanner exist in mind)
Best Leading Actor-Pyay Ti Oo (Made in Heart)
Best Leading Actress-Khine Thin Kyi (Goodmanner exist in mind)
Best Supporting Actor-Zin Wine (Made in Heart)
Best Supporting Actress-Wutt Hmone Shwe Yi (Made in Heart)
Best Screenplay-Zaw Myint Oo (Goodmanner exist in mind)
Best Cinematography-Toe win, Pyi Soe (Endless love)
Best Music-Khin Maung Gyi (Goodmanner exist in mind)
Best Edit-Thaw Zin (Goodmanner exist in mind)
Best Sound-Kyi Min Thein (Guile Project)
 
2015
Best Director-Wyne (I'm Rose, Darling)
Best Leading Actor-Nay Toe (Wrong Nat Khet of Battle)
Best Leading Actress-Phway Phway (I'm Rose, Darling)
Best Supporting Actor-Bay Lu Wa (Is this called love?)
Best Supporting Actress-Goon Pone (Is this called love?)
Best Music-Hla San Oo (Dear Wife)
Best Edit-Zaw Min Han-Thar-Myay (Love House 2028)
Best Cinematography-Zaw Myint (Salves of Cupid)
 
2016
Best Film-Oat Kyar Myat Pauk
Best Director-Nyunt Myanmar Nyi Nyi Aung (Oat Kyar Myat Pauk)
Best Leading Actor-Tun Tun (Oat Kyar Myat Pauk)
Best Leading Actress-Thet Mon Myint (Lovely Hate)
Best Supporting Actor-Lu Min (Prof Dr Saik Phwar and Myaing Yaza Tartay)
Best Cinematography-Luu Yadanar Treasure
Best Music-D’ramo (Luu Yadanar Treasure)
Best Sound-Kyi Min Thein (Witch Stone Letter)
Best Edit-Nyan Wint (?)
Special award-Jade world of Manaw Region

2017
Best Film-Nay Chi Hmar Shwe Yi Laung
Best Director-Sin Yaw Mg Mg (Eternal Mother)
Best Leading Actor-Nay Toe (Tar Tay Gyi)
Best Leading Actress-Eaindra Kyaw Zin (Knife in the Chest)
Best Supporting Actor-Myint Myat (Kyun)
Best Supporting Actress-Paing Phyo Thu (3Girls)
Best Cinematography-Kyauk Phyu Ba-day-thar (3Girls)
Best Music-Piano Tin Win Hlaing (Kun Lone days 40)
Best Sound-Thein Aung (Eternal Mother)
Best Edit-O win (Eternal Mother)
Best Screenplay-Wyne (Yin Bek Htae Ka Dar)
Lifetime Achievement-U Tint Aung (Bo Ga Lay)

2018
Best Director - Aww Ra Tha (Clinging With Hate)
Best Screenplay - Wyne (Shwe Kyar) 
Best Film - Shwe Kyar
Best Leading Actor - Thu Htoo San (Were Tiger) 
Best Leading Actress - Phway Phway (Shwe Kyar) 
Best Supporting Actor - Kyaw Kyaw Bo (Clinging with Hate) 
Best Supporting Actress - Aye Myat Thu (Naung Dwin Oo Dan Twin Zay Dee)

Records
Most awards to a single film
 Htar Wa Ra A Linn Tan Myar(Eternal Rays of Light, 2011)= 8
 Ngar Thu Ta Bar Yauk Kyar Mein Ma(Me, Another, Men, Women, 2002)= 7
 A Mayh Noh Boe(Value of Mother's Milk, 2003)= 7
 Hlyo Hwat Thaw Hnin(Mystery of Snow, 2004)= 7
 Taik Pwel Khaw Than(The Sound of War, 1995)= 5
 Myint Myat Hna Lon Thar(Noble Heart, 1997)= 5
 Hna Lon Hla Lu Mike(Good-Hearted Stupid Person, 2001)= 5
 Hsan Yay(Upstream, 2002)= 5
 Koe Sal Sah Thar Lein Mal(Ninety Times More Superior, 2007)= 5
 Pin Lal Htet Ka Nay Won Ni(The Red Sun at Above of Sea, 2010)= 5
 Kaung Kyoe Ko Hnite Ti Say Min(Keep Good Benefits at Your Body, 2014)= 5

Most awards won by a male
 Thukha = 8(Best Director (6), Best Picture (2))
 Nyunt Win = 7(Best Actor (3), Best Supporting Actor (4))
 Yan Aung = 6(Best Actor (6))
 Than Nyunt (Pan Thar) = 6(Best Cinematography (6))
 Zaw Min (Han Thar Myay) = 6(Best Film Editing (6))
 Zin Yaw Maung Maung = 6(Best Picture (3), Best Director (3))
 Maung Tin Oo = 5(Best Director (5))
 Kyaw Hein = 5(Best Actor (4), Best Supporting Actor (1))
 Kyi Soe Tun = 5(Best Director (4), Best Screenplay (1))
 Ko Ko Htay = 5(Best Cinematography (5))
 Chit Min Lu = 4(Best Cinematography (4))
 Pyay Ti Oo = 4(Best Actor (4))
 Lu Min = 4(Best Actor (2), Best Picture (1), Best Supporting Actor (1))
 Kyauk Phyu (Pa Dy Thar) = 4(Best Cinematography (4))
 Wyne (Own Creator) = 4(Best Director (2), Best Screenplay (2))

Most awards won by a female
 Myint Myint Khin = 6(Best Actress (3), Best Supporting Actress (2), Lifetime Achievement (1) )
 May Than Nu = 5(Best Actress (4), Best Supporting Actress (1))
 Moh Moh Myint Aung = 5(Best Actress (4), Best Supporting Actress (1))
 Kyi Kyi Htay = 4(Best Actress (2), Best Supporting Actress (2))
 Cho Pyone = 4(Best Actress (2), Best Supporting Actress (2))

Most awards for Best Director
 Thukha = 6
 Maung Tin Oo = 5
 Kyi Soe Tun= 4
 Zin Yaw Maung Maung = 3

Most awards for Best Actor 
 Yan Aung = 6
 Kyaw Hein = 4
 Pyay Ti Oo = 4
 Nyunt Win = 3
 Lwin Moe = 3
 Nay Toe = 3

Most awards for Best Actress 
 May Than Nu = 4
 Moh Moh Myint Aung =  4
 Myint Myint Khin = 3
 Wah Wah Win Shwe = 3
 Khin Thidar Htun = 3
 Htun Eaindra Bo = 3
 Phway Phway = 3

Most awards for Best Supporting Actor
 Nyunt Win = 4
 Kyauk Lon = 3
 Bo Ba Ko = 2
 Zaw Lin = 2
 Nay Aung = 2
 Zin Wyne = 2

Most awards for Best Supporting Actress
 Kyi Kyi Htay = 2
 Aye Aye Thin = 2
 Myint Myint Khin = 2
 Myint Myint Khaing = 2
 Cho Pyone = 2
 Soe Myat Nandar = 2
 Myat Kay Thi Aung = 2
 May Thinzar Oo = 2

Most awards for Best Screenplay
 Nyein Min = 3
 Zaw Myint Oo = 2
 Wyne (Own Creator) = 2

Most awards for Music
 Gita Lulin Maung Ko Ko = 3
 Zaw Myo Htut = 3
 Khin Maung Gyi = 3

Most awards for Best Cinematography
 Than Nyunt (Pan Thar) = 6
 Ko Ko Htay = 5
 Chit Min Lu = 4
 Kyauk Phyu (Pa Dy Thar) = 4
 San Maung = 3

Most awards for Best Sound
 San Oo = 2
 Kyi Min Thein = 2

Most awards for Best Film Editing
 Zaw Min (Han Thar Myay) = 6
 U Myint Khaing = 3

Significance
The significance of the awards has fluctuated along with the health of Burmese cinema. The number of eligible film entries each year has declined dramatically since the 1980s. Due to heightened competition from foreign films and other entertainment media as well as escalating costs of production, the number of feature-length Burmese films has gone from nearly 100 films per year in the 1970s to barely more than ten today. The number of films screened were 95 in 1978, 75 in 1983, 65 in 1985. In 2008, only 12 were screened. As the Burmese film industry struggles to produce films each year, films that do get produced are mostly with established directors, actors and actresses. Most Burmese films today are dominated by comedies.

The result is that the same coterie of players win the award year after year from a much shallower pool. It used to be that only few actors and actresses could claim as "academy award winner" or even fewer still as "repeat academy award winner". Venerable actors of old like Win Oo and Kawleikgyin Ne Win won just two each in their lifetime. Director Thukha and actress Myint Myint Khin who won six and five respectively were the exceptions, not the rule.

See also
Myanmar Motion Picture Museum

References

 
Awards established in 1952
1952 establishments in Burma